SpaceTurk, founded in 1998 as The Turkish Space Research Group, is a non-profit and volunteer group dedicated to work on space research. The group activities so far are:

 Execution of Middle East and Turkey representative of United Nations Space Generation Advisory Council UNSGAC,
 Establishment of Space Association of Turkic States (SATS),
 Yuri's Night organizations in several cities including Ankara and Istanbul,
 World Space Week organizations in several cities with a high participation rate of primary schools.
 Detection of environmental pollution due to the oil spills from the tankers with satellite views,
 Detection of the deforestation in Burundi with remote sensing,
 System design for a civilian, peace and science aimed launcher (ATA1 project).

See also
 List of astronomical societies

References

External links
 SpaceTurk website
 UNSGAC 2002-2003 Annual Report 
 World Space Week 2001 Annual Report 

Space organizations
Astronomy organizations
1998 establishments in Turkey
Scientific organizations established in 1998